Abutilon sandwicense, commonly known as the greenflower Indian mallow, is a species of flowering plant in the mallow family, Malvaceae, that is endemic to the island of Oahu, Hawaii, in the United States. Associated plants include lama (Diospyros sandwicensis), ēlama (D. hillebrandii), māmaki (Pipturus albidus), kalia (Elaeocarpus bifidus), āulu (Sapindus oahuensis), olopua (Nestegis sandwicensis), and alahee (Psydrax odorata). It is threatened by habitat loss.

References

External links 

 Abutilon sandwicense information from the Hawaiian Ecosystems at Risk project (HEAR)

sandwicense
Endemic flora of Hawaii
Biota of Oahu
Taxonomy articles created by Polbot